Bonne Jan "Bob" Wielinga (3 October 1945, Amsterdam – 10 February 2016, Amsterdam) was a Dutch professor at the University of Amsterdam.

Wielinga studied physics at the University of Amsterdam, where he was awarded a PhD in 1972 for a study in nuclear physics. He has performed research on the methodology of knowledge-based system design and knowledge acquisition. In 1986, Wielinga was appointed full professor of Social Science Informatics (SWI) in the Faculty of Psychology. Wielinga leads several research projects, including KADS, ACKnowledge, REFLECT and KADS-II and was one of the main contributors to the development of the KADS methodology for knowledge based system development.

Publications 
 Wielinga, Bob J., Schreiber,  A. Th. and Breuker, Joost A. "KADS: A modelling approach to knowledge engineering." Knowledge acquisition 4.1 (1992): 5-53.

See also
 Knowledge Acquisition and Documentation Structuring
 CommonKADS
 University of Amsterdam

References

External links
The information on this page was taken from Wielinga's homepage at the University of Amsterdam.

1945 births
University of Amsterdam alumni
Academic staff of the University of Amsterdam
Scientists from Amsterdam
2016 deaths